Eupithecia massiliata, the Epping pug, is a moth in the family Geometridae. The species was first described by Pierre Millière in 1865. It is found in Western/Southern Europe and North Africa. It was recorded from Epping Forest in Essex in 2002. It is suspected that the specimens were accidentally imported.

The wingspan is 18–19 mm.

The larvae feed on the flowers and leaves of oaks (Quercus), including holm oak (Quercus ilex) and cork oak (Quercus suber).

References

External links

"08582 Eupithecia massiliata Millière, 1865". Lepiforum e.V. Retrieved 30 April 2019.

Moths described in 1865
massiliata
Moths of Europe
Moths of Africa
Taxa named by Pierre Millière